The Phyllis J. Washington College of Education is home to three University of Montana departments: Counselor Education, Curriculum and Instruction, and Educational Leadership.

History
1900 - Department of Philosophy and Education taught courses in Theory and Practice of Education and the History of Education in second floor of University Hall
1917 - Master of Arts in education and Master of Education were established
1930 - Department of Education becomes School of Education
1955 - Elementary  teachers begin to earn degrees
1957 - Division of Educational Research (Institute for Educational Research and Service) and Service began with external funding as a means of supporting graduate education at UM
1978 - Department of Health and Physical Education (Department of Health and Human Performance) moved to the School of Education
1980 - The Department of Home Economics moved to the School of Education
1989 - Department of Home Economics eliminated
2008 - Department of Communicative Sciences and Disorders reinstituted
2009 - School of Education became the College of Education and Human Sciences
2019 - College of Education and Human Sciences becomes the College of Education

Study

Departments
The College of Education comprises five further departments as well as an Intercultural Youth and Family Development Program.
Communicative Sciences and Disorders
Focuses on the training of future professionals in the areas of Speech and Language Pathology.
Counselor Education
Focuses on the training of future school counselors.
Curriculum and Instruction
Focuses on teacher preparation
Houses both Masters and Doctoral programs
Educational Leadership
Health and Human Performance
Began as the Department of Physical Culture in 1906.
Intercultural Youth and Family Development Program

Institute of Educational Research and Service (IERS)
Founded in 1957, the Institute of Educational Research and Service is dedicated to the design, evaluation, and dissemination of programs that support the well-being of students and communities. The institution cooperates with numerous organizations to develop models for social and academic achievement

Hosted Programs

Montana Digital Academy

The Phyllis J. Washington College of Education and is the host of the Montana Digital Academy, Montana's publicly supported K-12 online program.  Montana Digital Academy's offices are in the Phyllis J. Washington Education Center.

New Building
In 2009 the university completed the Phyllis J. Washington Education Center, a 27,000 sq. ft. addition to what was then simply known as the Education Building.  The Center focuses on Early Childhood Education, Math and Science Instruction and Distance Learning.  The center also houses the largest omni globe - a large sphere that projects everything from the world to the planets - at any university in the nation.

The Center was officially unveiled on October 8, 2009 with 500 guests in attendance.  Attendance included industrialist Dennis Washington and his wife Phyllis for whom the center is named as well as U.S. Education Secretary Arne Duncan.

External links

Schools and colleges of the University of Montana
2009 establishments in Montana
Schools of education in Montana